Moritz Karl Ferdinand Wilhelm Hermann Walther Mumm von Schwarzenstein (1887 – 1959) was a German businessman and bobsledder who competed in the early 1930s. He was the one-time "champagne king" of Rheims in France, as part of the Mumm champagne making family.

Biography
Von Mumm was born in Frankfurt am Main in 1887, son to Peter Arnold Gottlieb Hermann Mumm von Schwarzenstein and Emma Luise Marie Passavant. He was an aviation pioneer who went to the United States in 1910 as pilot of the French entry in the Gordon Bennett Cup. While in the U.S., he met Frances Scoville, daughter of a Seneca, Kansas, banker. They were married at St George's, Hanover Square in London. Mrs. Scoville died in 1920 leaving one daughter behind, Mary, who was educated at a school in Aiken, South Carolina.  Mary later died in an automobile accident together with her aunt, Louise Scoville Treadwell.

Between meeting and marrying Frances Scoville, von Mumm became involved with Marie van Rensimer Barnes, who later shot him in her Paris apartment in 1912. Society barrister Oliver Bodington represented Mrs. van Rensimer Barnes.

Von Mumm returned to Germany at the outbreak of World War I. As his champagne winery was confiscated by the French, von Mumm sacrificed the prosperous 100-plus-year-old family business. Von Mumm married Baroness Marie Julia Mathilde von dem Bussche-Haddenhausen in 1924 and the couple later divorced in 1928.  The Baroness went on to marry Prince Ulrich of Wchinitz and Tettau. After the war, von Mumm salvaged little of his fortune, and lost what remained in the 1929 Wall Street crash. Thus, the "champagne king" saw his fortunes wither until he was living in a $10-a-week Manhattan boarding house.

In 1931, he tried to take his own life by shooting himself above the heart in the Long Island home of his old friend William H. vom Rath. His suicide note read: "Bury me as I am and keep this out of the newspapers." Von Mumm rallied and recovered.

An avid sportsman, shortly after his accident he took part in the bobsleigh four-man event at the 1932 Winter Olympics in Lake Placid, New York. His team finished seventh and last; however, Germany won a bronze medal overall. The gold medal was given to the USA.

Von Mumm's niece was prominent literary socialite, Elena Mumm Thornton Wilson, the 4th wife of Edmund Wilson, renowned essayist and critic.

See also
List of pilots awarded an Aviator's Certificate by the Aéro-Club de France in 1910.

References

External links

Grande marques et maisons de champagne
1932 Winter Olympics bobsleigh four-man results
"Bobbing". TIME. March 27, 1933. Features von Mumm.

Bobsledders at the 1932 Winter Olympics
German male bobsledders
1887 births
1959 deaths
Olympic bobsledders of Germany
Sportspeople from Frankfurt